Vanillin is an organic compound with the molecular formula .  It is a phenolic aldehyde.  Its functional groups include aldehyde, hydroxyl, and ether.  It is the primary component of the extract of the vanilla bean.  Synthetic vanillin is now used more often than natural vanilla extract as a flavoring in foods, beverages, and pharmaceuticals.

Vanillin and ethylvanillin are used by the food industry;  ethylvanillin is more expensive, but has a stronger note. It differs from vanillin by having an ethoxy group (−O−CH2CH3) instead of a methoxy group (−O−CH3).

Natural vanilla extract is a mixture of several hundred different compounds in addition to vanillin.  Artificial vanilla flavoring is often a solution of pure vanillin, usually of synthetic origin. Because of the scarcity and expense of natural vanilla extract,  synthetic preparation of its predominant component has long been of interest.  The first commercial synthesis of vanillin began with the more readily available natural compound eugenol (4-allyl-2-methoxyphenol).  Today, artificial vanillin is made either from guaiacol or lignin.

Lignin-based artificial vanilla flavoring is alleged to have a richer flavor profile than oil-based flavoring; the difference is due to the presence of acetovanillone, a minor component in the lignin-derived product that is not found in vanillin synthesized from guaiacol.

History 
Although it is generally accepted that vanilla was domesticated in Mesoamerica and subsequently spread to the Old World in the 16th century, in 2019, researchers published a paper stating that vanillin residue had been discovered inside jars within a tomb in Israel dating to the 2nd millennium BCE, suggesting the cultivation of an unidentified, Old World-endemic Vanilla species in Canaan since the Middle Bronze Age. Traces of vanillin were also found in wine jars in Jerusalem, which were used by the Judahite elite before the city was destroyed in 586 BCE.

Vanilla beans, called tlilxochitl, were discovered and cultivated as a flavoring for beverages by native Mesoamerican peoples, most famously the Totonacs of modern-day Veracruz, Mexico. Since at least the early 15th century, the Aztecs used vanilla as a flavoring for chocolate in drinks called xocohotl.

Vanillin was first isolated as a relatively pure substance in 1858 by Nicolas-Theodore Gobley, who obtained it by evaporating a vanilla extract to dryness and recrystallizing the resulting solids from hot water. In 1874, the German scientists Ferdinand Tiemann and Wilhelm Haarmann deduced its chemical structure, at the same time finding a synthesis for vanillin from coniferin, a glucoside of isoeugenol found in pine bark. Tiemann and Haarmann founded a company Haarmann and Reimer (now part of Symrise) and started the first industrial production of vanillin using their process in Holzminden, Germany. In 1876, Karl Reimer synthesized vanillin (2) from guaiacol (1).

By the late 19th century, semisynthetic vanillin derived from the eugenol found in clove oil was commercially available.

Synthetic vanillin became significantly more available in the 1930s, when production from clove oil was supplanted by production from the lignin-containing waste produced by the sulfite pulping process for preparing wood pulp for the paper industry.  By 1981, a single pulp and paper mill in Thorold, Ontario supplied 60% of the world market for synthetic vanillin.  However, subsequent developments in the wood pulp industry have made its lignin wastes less attractive as a raw material for vanillin synthesis.  Today, approximately 15% of the world's production of vanillin is still made from lignin wastes, while approximately 85% synthesized in a two-step process from the petrochemical precursors guaiacol and glyoxylic acid.

Beginning in 2000, Rhodia began marketing biosynthetic vanillin prepared by the action of microorganisms on ferulic acid extracted from rice bran.  At  USD$700/kg, this product, sold under the trademarked name Rhovanil Natural, is not cost-competitive with petrochemical vanillin, which sells for around US$15/kg. However, unlike vanillin synthesized from lignin or guaiacol, it can be labeled as a natural flavoring.

Occurrence 

Vanillin is most prominent as the principal flavor and aroma compound in vanilla. Cured vanilla pods contain about 2% by dry weight vanillin; on cured pods of high quality, relatively pure vanillin may be visible as a white dust or "frost" on the exterior of the pod.

It is also found in Leptotes bicolor, a species of orchid native to Paraguay and southern Brazil, and the Southern Chinese red pine.

At lower concentrations, vanillin contributes to the flavor and aroma profiles of foodstuffs as diverse as olive oil, butter, raspberry, and lychee fruits.

Aging in oak barrels imparts vanillin to some wines, vinegar, and spirits.

In other foods, heat treatment generates vanillin from other compounds.  In this way, vanillin contributes to the flavor and aroma of coffee, maple syrup, and whole-grain products, including corn tortillas and oatmeal.

Chemistry

Natural production
Natural vanillin is extracted from the seed pods of Vanilla planifolia, a vining orchid native to Mexico, but now grown in tropical areas around the globe.  Madagascar is presently the largest producer of natural vanillin.

As harvested, the green seed pods contain vanillin in the form of its β--glucoside; the green pods do not have the flavor or odor of vanilla.

After being harvested, their flavor is developed by a months-long curing process, the details of which vary among vanilla-producing regions, but in broad terms it proceeds as follows:

First, the seed pods are blanched in hot water, to arrest the processes of the living plant tissues.  Then, for 1–2 weeks, the pods are alternately sunned and sweated: during the day they are laid out in the sun, and each night wrapped in cloth and packed in airtight boxes to sweat.  During this process, the pods become dark brown, and enzymes in the pod release vanillin as the free molecule.  Finally, the pods are dried and further aged for several months, during which time their flavors further develop.  Several methods have been described for curing vanilla in days rather than months, although they have not been widely developed in the natural vanilla industry, with its focus on producing a premium product by established methods, rather than on innovations that might alter the product's flavor profile.

Biosynthesis

Although the exact route of vanillin biosynthesis in V. planifolia is currently unknown, several pathways are proposed for its biosynthesis. Vanillin biosynthesis is generally agreed to be part of the phenylpropanoid pathway starting with -phenylalanine, which is deaminated by phenylalanine ammonia lyase (PAL) to form t-cinnamic acid. The para position of the ring is then hydroxylated by the cytochrome P450 enzyme cinnamate 4-hydroxylase (C4H/P450) to create p-coumaric acid. Then, in the proposed ferulate pathway, 4-hydroxycinnamoyl-CoA ligase (4CL) attaches p-coumaric acid to coenzyme A (CoA) to create p-coumaroyl CoA. Hydroxycinnamoyl transferase (HCT) then converts p-coumaroyl CoA to 4-coumaroyl shikimate/quinate. This subsequently undergoes oxidation by the P450 enzyme coumaroyl ester 3’-hydroxylase (C3’H/P450) to give caffeoyl shikimate/quinate. HCT then exchanges the shikimate/quinate for CoA to create caffeoyl CoA, and 4CL removes CoA to afford caffeic acid. Caffeic acid then undergoes methylation by caffeic acid O-methyltransferase (COMT) to give ferulic acid. Finally, vanillin synthase hydratase/lyase (vp/VAN) catalyzes hydration of the double bond in ferulic acid followed by a retro-aldol elimination to afford vanillin. Vanillin can also be produced from vanilla glycoside with the additional final step of deglycosylation. In the past p-hydroxybenzaldehyde was speculated to be a precursor for vanillin biosynthesis. However, a 2014 study using radiolabelled precursor indicated that p-hydroxybenzaldehyde do not synthesise vanillin or vanillin glucoside in the vanilla orchids.

Chemical synthesis
The demand for vanilla flavoring has long exceeded the supply of vanilla beans. , the annual demand for vanillin was 12,000 tons, but only 1,800 tons of natural vanillin were produced. The remainder was produced by chemical synthesis. Vanillin was first synthesized from eugenol (found in oil of clove) in 1874–75, less than 20 years after it was first identified and isolated. Vanillin was commercially produced from eugenol until the 1920s. Later it was synthesized from lignin-containing "brown liquor", a byproduct of the sulfite process for making wood pulp. Counterintuitively, though it uses waste materials, the lignin process is no longer popular because of environmental concerns, and today most vanillin is produced from the petrochemical raw material guaiacol. Several routes exist for synthesizing vanillin from guaiacol.

At present, the most significant of these is the two-step process practiced by Rhodia since the 1970s, in which guaiacol (1) reacts with glyoxylic acid by electrophilic aromatic substitution. The resulting vanillylmandelic acid (2) is then converted by 4-Hydroxy-3-methoxyphenylglyoxylic acid (3) to vanillin (4) by oxidative decarboxylation.

Wood-based vanillin
15% of the world's production of vanillin is produced from lignosulfonates, a byproduct from the manufacture of cellulose via the sulfite process. The sole producer of wood-based vanillin is the company Borregaard located in Sarpsborg, Norway.

Wood-based vanillin is produced by copper-catalyzed oxidation of the lignin structures in lignosulfonates under alkaline conditions and is claimed by the manufacturing company to be preferred by their customers due to, among other reasons, its much lower carbon footprint than petrochemically synthesized vanillin.

Fermentation
The company Evolva has developed a genetically modified microorganism which can produce vanillin. Because the microbe is a processing aid, the resulting vanillin would not fall under U.S. GMO labeling requirements, and because the production is nonpetrochemical, food using the ingredient can claim to contain "no artificial ingredients".

Using ferulic acid as an input and a specific non GMO species of Amycolatopsis bacteria, natural vanillin can be produced.

Biochemistry
Several studies have suggested that vanillin can affect the performance of antibiotics in laboratory conditions.

Uses 

The largest use of vanillin is as a flavoring, usually in sweet foods.  The ice cream and chocolate industries together comprise 75% of the market for vanillin as a flavoring, with smaller amounts being used in confections and baked goods.

Vanillin is also used in the fragrance industry, in perfumes, and to mask unpleasant odors or tastes in medicines, livestock fodder, and cleaning products. It is also used in the flavor industry, as a very important key note for many different flavors, especially creamy profiles such as cream soda.

Additionally, vanillin can be used as a general-purpose stain for visualizing spots on thin-layer chromatography plates.  This stain yields a range of colors for these different components.

Vanillin–HCl staining can be used to visualize the localisation of tannins in cells.

Manufacturing
Vanillin has been used as a chemical intermediate in the production of pharmaceuticals, cosmetics, and other fine chemicals. In 1970, more than half the world's vanillin production was used in the synthesis of other chemicals. As of 2016, vanillin uses have expanded to include perfumes, flavoring and aromatic masking in medicines, various consumer and cleaning products, and livestock foods.

Adverse effects 
Vanillin can trigger migraine headaches in a small fraction of the people who experience migraines.

Some people have allergic reactions to vanilla. They may be allergic to synthetically produced vanilla but not to natural vanilla, or the other way around, or to both.

Vanilla orchid plants can trigger contact dermatitis, especially among people working in the vanilla trade if they come into contact with the plant's sap.  An allergic contact dermatitis called vanillism produces swelling and redness, and sometimes other symptoms. The sap of most species of vanilla orchid which exudes from cut stems or where beans are harvested can cause moderate to severe dermatitis if it comes in contact with bare skin. The sap of vanilla orchids contains calcium oxalate crystals, which are thought to be the main causative agent of contact dermatitis in vanilla plantation workers.

A pseudophytodermatitis called vanilla lichen can be caused by tiny mites.

Ecology 
Scolytus multistriatus, one of the vectors of the Dutch elm disease, uses vanillin as a signal to find a host tree during oviposition.

See also 
 Phenolic compounds in wine
 Other positional isomers:
 Isovanillin
 ortho-Vanillin
 2-Hydroxy-5-methoxybenzaldehyde
 2-Hydroxy-4-methoxybenzaldehyde
 Benzaldehyde
 Protocatechuic aldehyde
 Syringaldehyde

References

Notes 

Flavors
Perfume ingredients
Hydroxybenzaldehydes
Vanilloids
O-methylated natural phenols
Vanilla
Total synthesis